Quzhd (also Romanized as Qūzhd) is a village in Bala Velayat Rural District, in the Central District of Kashmar County, Razavi Khorasan Province, Iran. At the 2006 census, its population was 4,024, in 1,087 families.

Historical sites, ancient artifacts and tourism

Grave of Pir Quzhd 
Grave of Pir Quzhd is a historical Grave related to the Before the 11th century AH and is located in Quzhd, Razavi Khorasan Province.

Rig Castle 

Rig castle is a Castle related to the Seljuq dynasty and is located in the Kashmar County, Quzhd village.

Talaabad Watermill 
Talaabad Watermill is a Watermill related to the late Safavid period and is located in Kashmar County, Central District, Quzhd village.

Qanats of Quzhd 
The Qanats of Quzhd is a historical Qanat is located in Quzhd in Kashmar County.

References 

Populated places in Kashmar County